Carron may refer to:

Rivers
 River Carron, Forth, a river in Central Scotland
 River Carron, Wester Ross
 River Carron, Sutherland
 Carron River (Queensland), a river in Australia
 Carron Water, Aberdeenshire, a river that flows into the North Sea in Stonehaven
 Carron Water, Dumfriesshire, a river that flows into the River Nith near Thornhill
 Loch Carron, a sea loch on the west coast of Ross and Cromarty in the Scottish Highlands

Settlements
 Carron, Strathspey, a small village on the banks of the River Spey near Aberlour
 Carron, Falkirk, an area of Falkirk
 Carronbridge,
 Carron, County Clare, a small village in the heart of The Burren, County Clare, Ireland

People
 Arthur Carron (1900-1967), British opera singer
 Julián Carrón (born 1950), Spanish Catholic priest
 Owen Carron (born 1953), Irish republican activist and politician
 Pernelle Carron (born 1986), French ice dancer
 Pierre Carron (1932–2022), French sculptor and painter
 Schuyler Carron (1921–1964), American bobsledder
 William Carron (1902–1969), British trade unionist and activist

Other uses
 Carron Company, an ironworks dating from 1759 of significant historical importance.
 , several ships of the British Royal Navy
 Carron Primary School, a primary school situated in Carron

See also

Carlon
 Caron (disambiguation)